Kareh Chal (also Romanized as Kareh Chāl and Koreh Chal; also known as Kara-Chay) is a village in Karasf Rural District, in the Central District of Khodabandeh County, Zanjan Province, Iran. At the 2006 census, its population was 120, in 24 families.

References 

Populated places in Khodabandeh County